Johann Tanzer (1927-2016) was a Canadian sailboat designer, who founded the sailboat manufacturer that bore his name, Tanzer Industries, in 1966.

Early life
Johann Tanzer was born on 3 January 1927 in the village of Velden am Wörther See, in the province of Carinthia, Austria. In 1941 Tanzer began his apprenticeship in shipbuilding at the Valentin Feinig (Feinig Werft) boat yard on the shores of the Wörthersee. The shipyard built sailing yachts, cruiser-racer and motor boats. Johann Tanzer completed his apprenticeship before being drafted into the Navy on Jan. 3, 1945, his birthday.

Professional life

Tanzer immigrated to Canada in 1956, with a portfolio of sailboat designs that he hoped to put into production. He first worked in the aerospace industry, but quickly decided to pursue boat-building instead.

Tanzer is noted as the designer of several commercially successful sailboat designs, the most produced of which is the Tanzer 22, with 2,271 built between 1970-1986.

His company, located in Dorion, Quebec and with satellite manufacturing operations on both American coasts, became one of the largest boat builders in Canada during its 20 years in business, before it was forced into bankruptcy in 1986.

Personal life
Tanzer was married to Gabriella, who died in 2012. They had three children, two grandchildren and one great grandchild.

Death
Tanzer died on 23 October 2016 at age 89 at the Lakeshore General Hospital, in the Montreal suburb of Pointe-Claire.

Boat designs

Tanzer's designs include:
Constellation 16
Overnighter 16
Tanzer 7.5
Tanzer 8.5
Tanzer 10.5
Tanzer 14
Tanzer 16
Tanzer 22
Tanzer 26
Tanzer 28

References

External links

Johann Tanzer
1927 births
2016 deaths